An integrative level, or level of organization, is a set of phenomena emerging from pre-existing phenomena of a lower level. The levels concept is an intellectual framework for structuring reality. It arranges all entities, structures, and processes in the universe, or in a certain field of study, into a hierarchy, typically based on how complex their organization is. When arranged this way, each entity is three things at the same time: It is made up of parts from the previous level below. It is a whole in its own right. And it is a part of the whole that is on the next level above. Typical examples include life emerging from non-living substances, and consciousness emerging from nervous systems.

Levels
The main levels usually acknowledged are those of matter, life, mind, and society. These are called strata in philosopher Nicolai Hartmann's ontology. They can be further analyzed into more specific layers, such as those of particles, atoms, molecules, and rocks forming the material stratum, or those of cells, organisms, populations, and ecosystems forming the life stratum.

The sequence of levels is often described as one of increasing complexity, although it is not clear whether this is always true: for example, parasitism emerges on pre-existing organisms, although parasites are often simpler than their originating forms.

Philosophies
Ideas connected to integrative levels can be found in the works of both materialist philosophers and anti-materialist ones. Some philosophers and scientists have argued against certain ideas about levels of organization (see ).

See also

 Antireductionism
 Big History
 Biological organisation
 Boundary problem (spatial analysis)
 Hierarchy theory
 Level of analysis
 Mereology
 Mereotopology
 Model of hierarchical complexity
 Modifiable areal unit problem
 Nicolai Hartmann
 Scale (analytical tool)
 Spatial scale
 Structuralism (biology)
 The central science
 Tree of knowledge system
 Unity of science
 Vitalism

References 

 
 
 
 
 
 
 
 
 
 
 
 
 
 
 
 
 
 
 
 
 
 
  Foreword by Joseph Needham.

Arguments against levels of organization

  See the section: "2.4 Levels skepticism and deflationary accounts".
 
 
 
 
 
 
 
 
 

Ordering
Emergence

